Kevin Duvan Ante Rosero (born 3 December 1998) is a Colombian professional footballer who plays as a forward for Greek Super League club PAS Giannina.

Honours

Individual
 Maltese Premier League Top scorer: 2020–21 (17 goals)

References

1998 births
Living people
Colombian footballers
Colombian expatriate footballers
Maltese Challenge League players
Maltese Premier League players
Super League Greece players
C.D.R. Quarteirense players
St. Lucia F.C. players
Volos N.F.C. players
PAS Giannina F.C. players
Colombian expatriate sportspeople in Portugal
Expatriate footballers in Portugal
Colombian expatriate sportspeople in Malta
Expatriate footballers in Malta
Colombian expatriate sportspeople in Greece
Expatriate footballers in Greece
Association football forwards